Upakit Pachariyangkun (also spelt Uppakit Pachareeyangkun; born 28 October 1961) is a Thai businessman and senator, known for serving as chairman of United Power of Asia and Allure Group. He was appointed by Thailand's military junta, the National Council for Peace and Order, as a Senator of Thailand on May 24, 2019. In 2019, Upakit declared assets worth , making him Thailand's wealthiest senator.

Early life and education
Upakit attended Skidmore College in New York, where he earned a Bachelor's degree in political science. He subsequently obtained a Master's degree in Industrial Development from Vrije Universiteit Brussel. He then joined the Ministry of Foreign Affairs.

Business interests 
Upakit founded Allure Group in Thailand. Upakit expanded his business interests to neighbouring Myanmar through a partnership with Tun Min Latt, a Burmese businessman. In 1999, the two men co-founded Myanmar Allure Group to operate Allure Resort, an illegal hotel and casino, in the Burmese-Thai border town of Tachileik. Six percent of the casino's income was distributed to the Myanmar Armed Forces. In August 2019, he divested from Myanmar Allure, reportedly selling casino resort for $8.15 million to a business partner, Chakris Kajkumjorndej, in order to join the Senate of Thailand. Dean Young Gultula, Upakit's son-in-law, was named his successor.

On September 17, 2022, following a police raid, Thai authorities arrested Tun Min Latt, Dean Young Gultula, and two Thai nationals on money laundering and drug trafficking charges. Authorities seized $8.96 million worth of assets, including luxury cars, watches and bags, along with $239,091 in cash. On 3 October, Thai news outlets reported that the Criminal Court of Thailand had issued an arrest warrant for Upakit in connection with the raid. Within hours, Upakit's arrest warrant was abruptly overturned, and court summons were instead issued. As an active legislator, Upakit purportedly had legal immunity under Thai law until the end of the legislative session on February 28, 2023. Following the arrests, Metropolitan Police Bureau officers who had sought the arrest warrant were mysteriously transferred to remote provincial posts. Kritsanat Thanasupanat, the lead investigator, was involuntarily transferred to a remote post in Chaiyaphum province.

On February 15, during a parliamentary debate, Rangsiman Rome implicated Upakit in a money laundering and drug trafficking case involving Upakit's son-in-law and Tun Min Latt. At a press conference thereafter, Rangsit accused Upakit of falsely declaring his assets before assuming his senate seat in 2019. Upakit owns the plot of land in Bangkok which houses the headquarters of the United Thai Nation Party.

On March 11, the Thai Judicial Commission's testimony from Manapong Wongpiwat, a police investigator, regarding Upakit's revoked arrest warrant was leaked to the media. The leaked testimony prompted concerns regarding internal interference by Criminal Court leadership in stopping the arrest warrant, and the state of judicial independence in Thailand. On March 13, Damrongsak Kittiprapas, head of the Royal Thai Police, ordered a probe into irregularities surrounding the sudden revocation of Upakit's arrest warrant back in October. The following day, Chotiwat Luengprasert, the president of the Supreme Court of Thailand, launched a fact-finding committee to conduct a formal investigation.

Personal life
Upakit's father, is a former diplomat and Thai foreign affairs minister. He has one sister, Thawadee. Upakit was previously married to Pareena Kraikupt, a politician.

References

Thai businesspeople
Members of the Senate of Thailand
1961 births
Living people
Skidmore College alumni
Vrije Universiteit Brussel alumni